Rosa rubiginosa (sweet briar, sweetbriar rose, sweet brier or eglantine; syn. R. eglanteria) is a species of rose native to Europe and western Asia.

Description

It is a dense deciduous shrub 2–3 meters high and across, with the stems bearing numerously hooked prickles. The foliage has a strong apple-like fragrance. The leaves are pinnately compound, 5–9  cm long, with 5–9 rounded to oval leaflets with a serrated margin, and numerous glandular hairs. The flowers are 1.8–3  cm in diameter, the five petals being pink with a white base, and the numerous stamens yellow; the flowers are produced in clusters of 2–7 together, from late spring to mid-summer. The fruit is a globose to oblong red hip 1–2 cm in diameter.

Etymology
Its name eglantine is from Middle English eglentyn, from Old French aiglantin (adj.), from aiglent 'sweetbrier', from Vulgar Latin *aculentus (with the ending of spinulentus 'thorny, prickly'), from Latin aculeus 'prickle', from acus 'needle'. Sweet refers to the sweet, apple fragrance of the leaves, while briar ~ brier refers to it being a thorny bush.

Distribution and habitat
Rosa rubiginosa is native to most of Europe with the exception of the extreme north (above 61°N), where it inhabits pastures and thorny bushes from the montane to the subalpine floor, with a sunny, continental climate. It is somewhat rare, with isolated specimens near roads and pastures frequented by cattle. Its presence is doubtful in western Asia. In Southern Europe it lives in higher altitudes, usually . In Portugal it is classified as Critically Endangered and is restricted to the Serra da Estrela range.

Cultivation and uses
In addition to its pink flowers, it is valued for its scent and the hips that form after the flowers and persist well into the winter. Graham Thomas recommends that it should be planted on the south or west side of the garden so that the fragrance will be brought into the garden on warm, moist winds. A specimen without any scent, and blush to white flowers may be the closely related fieldbriar, Rosa agrestis.

The tea made from the hips of this rose is very popular in Europe and elsewhere, where it is considered a healthy way for people to get their daily dose of vitamin C and other nutrients. A cup of rosehip tea will provide the minimum daily adult requirement of vitamin C. During World War II the British relied on rose hips and hops as the sources for their vitamins A and C. It was a common British wartime expression to say that: "We are getting by on our hips and hops."

In Tunisia, natural flower water is produced from its flowers.

In Chile and Argentina, where it is known in Spanish as "Rosa Mosqueta", it is cultivated to produce marmalades and cosmetic products, and has escaped into the wild in and near the Andes.

Invasive species
 In Argentina, it has become an invasive species in most part of patagonia, mostly where the Patagonian steppe meets the Patagonian forests, cattle spread the seed efficiently through their feces. Poor knowledge of how detrimental to the local economy and native species lead Rosa rubiginosa to become the threat that is today.
It is estimates that it causes several millions of dollars worth of damage.

Rosa rubiginosa is an invasive species in southeast Australia.
It is classified as a restricted plant in New Zealand and is banned from sale, propagation and distribution in the Auckland, Canterbury, and Southland regions. The New Zealand Department of Conservation classifies R. rubiginosa as an "environmental weed". The plant is present in extensive areas of pasture and tussock grasslands in the Otago and Canterbury regions, where the seeds are spread by cattle, possums and birds that eat the hips. Growth from seed is aided by the reduction in competing pasture by rabbits.
It is listed as a Category 1 Declared Weed in South Africa. These plants may no longer be planted or propagated, and all trade in their seeds, cuttings or other propagative material is prohibited.

References

External links
GRIN-Global Web v 1.9.7.1: species treatment of Rosa rubiginosa (Eglantine, Sweetbriar)
Europaea: Rosa rubiginosa
Weedbusters (New Zealand): Rosa rubiginosa 
Roses of Constantinople

rubiginosa
Flora of Europe
Flora of Iran
Flora of Iraq
Flora of Turkey
Garden plants of Asia
Garden plants of Europe
Plants described in 1771
Taxa named by Carl Linnaeus
Taxobox binomials not recognized by IUCN